Taimali Township is a rural township in Taitung County, Taiwan. It has a population of 10,763 in 96.6523 km2 area. Taimali Township is located on the Pacific coast. The indigenous Amis and Paiwan peoples make up one-third of the population.

History
Tjavualji was established 1,000 years ago by the Qian YaoKao, also called the Da Ma, who were ancestors of the Paiwan people. Qing era records show the placename written variously, etc. According to Paiwan legend it had been called "the village of sunrise" (Jabauli or Tjavualji in Paiwan language) because there the sun rises from the eastern sea.

In the early 1900s (under Japanese rule), other aborigines such as the Amis and Paiwan peoples were moved to the village. In 1920, the village was officially called , which is essentially the name used up to now. During the 1940s (also under Japanese rule), some residents from Miaoli, Nantou, Changhua, Yunlin, Chiayi, Tainan, Kaohsiung, and Pingtung also settled in the area.

After Taiwan was handed over from Japan to the Republic of China in 1945, its name was modified to Taimali Village (太麻里村).

Administrative divisions
The township comprises nine villages: Beili, Dawang, Duoliang, Huayuan, Jinlun, Meihe, Sanhe, Taihe and Xianglan.

Tourist attractions

 Duoliang Station
 Aboriginal People Ancestor's Birthplace Stele
 Fushan Park
 Jinjhen Mountain Agriculture Areas
 Kimlun Hot Springs Scenic Areas
 Millennium Dawn Commemorate Parks
 Sanho Waterfront Park

Transportation

TRA - South-link line
Jinlun Station
Longxi Station
Taimali Station
 Provincial Highway 9
 Jinlun Bridge

References

Townships in Taitung County
Taiwan placenames originating from Formosan languages